John and Paul were Christians martyred in Rome c. AD 362.

John and Paul or Paul and John may also refer to:

 Paul the Apostle and John the Apostle in the New Testament 
 John Lennon and Paul McCartney of the Beatles
 Lennon–McCartney, their songwriting partnership
 Santi Giovanni e Paolo (disambiguation), several uses

See also
 
 John (disambiguation)
 Paul (disambiguation)
 John Paul (disambiguation)
 Paul John (disambiguation)
 Brothers Paul Nash (artist) (1889–1946) and John Nash (artist) (1893–1977) 
 Brothers John Horvat and Paul Horvat, in 1390s Hungary–Croatia